A Private War is a 2018 American biographical war drama film directed by Matthew Heineman, and starring Rosamund Pike as journalist Marie Colvin. The film is based on the 2012 article "Marie Colvin’s Private War" in Vanity Fair by Marie Brenner. The film was written by Arash Amel and features Jamie Dornan, Tom Hollander and Stanley Tucci.

The film premiered at the 2018 Toronto International Film Festival and was released in the United States on November 2, 2018. It received positive reviews from critics, who praised Pike's performance. At the 76th Golden Globe Awards, the film earned nominations for Best Actress in a Motion Picture – Drama (Pike) and Best Original Song ("Requiem for A Private War"), while director Matthew Heineman received a nomination for Outstanding Directorial Achievement of a First Time Feature Film Director from the Directors Guild of America.

Plot
Marie Colvin is an American journalist for The Sunday Times, visiting the most dangerous countries and documenting their civil wars.

In 2001, while trekking with the Tamil Tigers, Colvin and her crew are ambushed by the Sri Lankan Army. Despite her attempt to surrender, an RPG fires in her direction, wounding her to the point that she loses her left eye. Afterward, Colvin decides to wear an eyepatch.

Diagnosed with PTSD, Colvin is still determined to look for new stories, and argues with her boss, Sean Ryan, about conflicts she wants to cover, including Iraq, where she meets war photographer Paul Conroy, and Libya. She lives in London when not traveling the world, and begins a relationship with Tony Shaw (Stanley Tucci).

In February 2012, Conroy and Colvin decide to cover the conflict in the city of Homs, where they find 28,000 Syrian men, women, and children caught in the crossfire. After Conroy and Colvin send their story to Ryan, Colvin decides to broadcast to CNN to bring awareness to civilian casualties. As Marie, Paul, and another reporter, Rémi Ochlik, flee the building they had used as a media centre, the street is peppered with explosions. Paul, injured and shellshocked, wakes to find Colvin and Ochlik killed from the explosions and subsequent pile-up of rubble.

The movie ends with imagery of the devastated city of Homs, followed by an interview of the real Marie Colvin, with the quote: "You're never going to get to where you're going if you acknowledge fear."

Cast

 Rosamund Pike as Marie Colvin
 Jamie Dornan as Paul Conroy
 Tom Hollander as Sean Ryan, The Sunday Times' foreign editor and Marie's boss
 Nikki Amuka-Bird as Rita Williams, Marie's friend
 Faye Marsay as Kate Richardson
 Greg Wise as Professor David Irens
 Corey Johnson as Norm Coburn, another photographer
 Stanley Tucci as Tony Shaw
Fady Elsayed as Mourad

Production
The film was produced in Jordan and London, and was shot by Robert Richardson. It features an original song by Annie Lennox, entitled "Requiem for A Private War".

Release
In February 2018, Aviron Pictures acquired distribution rights to the film. The film had its world premiere at the 2018 Toronto International Film Festival on September 7, 2018, and had its European premiere at the Mayor's Gala in the BFI London Film Festival. It also screened at the Mill Valley Film Festival, Hamptons International Film Festival, and the Woodstock Film Festival. The film was released on November 2, 2018, in limited release, before expanding nationwide on November 16, 2018. A Private War was released in the UK and Ireland on 15 February 2019.

Reception

Critical response
The website's critical consensus reads: "A Private War honors its real-life subject with a sober appraisal of the sacrifices required of journalists on the front lines—and career-best work by Rosamund Pike." On review aggregator Metacritic, the film has a weighted average score of 75 out of 100 based on 32 critics, indicating "generally favorable reviews".

Peter Debruge of Variety called it "an incredibly sophisticated, psychologically immersive" film.

Accolades

References

External links
 
 
 
 

2018 films
American biographical films
American biographical drama films
Films shot in London
Films shot in Jordan
Films produced by Charlize Theron
Films based on newspaper and magazine articles
Films about journalists
2018 biographical drama films
Films set in Sri Lanka (1948–present)
2018 drama films
Films produced by Basil Iwanyk
Films set in Syria
2010s English-language films
2010s American films
Films directed by Matthew Heineman